New York's 81st State Assembly district is one of the 150 districts in the New York State Assembly. It has been represented by Jeffrey Dinowitz since 1994.

Geography
District 80 is in The Bronx. It comprises the neighborhoods of Kingsbridge, Marble Hill, Norwood, Riverdale, Van Cortlandt Village, Wakefield, and Woodlawn Heights.

Recent election results

2022

2020

2018

2016

2014

2012

2010

2008

References

81